913 Battalion was part of 91 South West African Brigade.

History
This unit was formed in 1980 at Namutoni situated 114 km kilometers northwest of Tsumeb.
91 SWA Brigade was the Reaction Force with its base in Windhoek in Sector 40.
It acted as a mobile reserve to support SWATF operations in sectors 10 and in northern Namibia and was modeled on SADF motorised brigade.

913 Battalion was part 91 Brigade

Operational area
The Battalions main operational area was Owamboland.

Roll of Honour
 23 Mar 1980: 71260731BT Corporal Renier Stephanus van Zyl from Regiment Namutoni SWATF was Killed in Action during a contact with PLAN insurgents in Northern Owamboland. He was 24.

See also
 Namibian War of Independence
 South African Border War

References

Further reading
 Helmoed-Romer Heitman (Author), Paul Hannon (Illustrator), Modern African Wars (3): South-West Africa (Men-At-Arms Series, 242),  Osprey Publishing (November 28, 1991) .

Military history of Namibia
Military units and formations of the Cold War
Military units and formations of South Africa
Military units and formations of South Africa in the Border War
Military units and formations established in 1980